María de los Dolores Olmedo y Patiño Suarez (December 14, 1908 – July 26, 2002; Mexico City) was a Mexican businesswoman, philanthropist and musician, better known for her friendship with the Mexican painters Frida Kahlo and her husband Diego Rivera; she appeared in some of his paintings. Following Rivera's death in 1957, she and Rivera's daughter Guadalupe asked then president Adolfo López Mateos to consider Rivera and José Clemente Orozco's paintings historical monuments.

Museo Dolores Olmedo

In 1962, she acquired a property at La Noria in Xochimilco, southern Mexico City, which she later converted into a museum named after herself in 1994. Donating her entire collection of art including pre-Hispanic, colonial, folk, modern and contemporary art, the Dolores Olmedo Patiño Museum host the greatest collection of Frida Kahlo, Diego Rivera and Angelina Beloff. Onn her death in 2002, she left funds for taking care of her museum, now open to the public.

The five-building complex contains up to 150 paintings, including 145 Riveras, 25 Kahlos (and some of their scripts and drawings), nearly 6,000 pre-Hispanic figurines and sculptures as well as diverse living animals such as geese, ducks, six Xoloitzcuintles and Indian peafowls kept in gardens. New areas have been added to the museum, "her private rooms" where she kept original decorations of her house such as ivory, china and artwork by artists whom she nurtured in her latter years including José Juárez and Francisco Guevara.

Tribute
In 2018, a Google Doodle was created to celebrate what would have been her 110th birthday.

References 

20th-century Mexican businesswomen
20th-century Mexican businesspeople
Mexican art collectors
Mexican philanthropists
Museum founders
1908 births
2002 deaths
Businesspeople from Mexico City
20th-century philanthropists
Women art collectors
20th-century women philanthropists